Nicolas Dessum (born 20 February 1977) is a French former ski jumper.

Career
His best finishes at the Winter Olympics occurred at Lillehammer in 1994 with a sixth in the team large hill and a 14th in the individual normal hill events. Dessum's best individual at the FIS Nordic World Ski Championships was fifth in the large hill at Trondheim in 1997. His best finish at the Ski-flying World Championships was 13th at Vikersund in 2000.

Dessum's only World Cup win was in a large hill event in Japan in 1995. Dessum retired from the World Cup in 2007 during the summer GP.

World Cup

Standings

Wins

External links

Official website 

1977 births
Ski jumpers at the 1994 Winter Olympics
Ski jumpers at the 1998 Winter Olympics
Ski jumpers at the 2002 Winter Olympics
French male ski jumpers
Living people
Olympic ski jumpers of France
Sportspeople from Lyon